Allocasuarina eriochlamys is a shrub of the genus Allocasuarina native to the Goldfields-Esperance region of Western Australia.

It flowers from April to May and is found in a variety of soils.

There are two recognised subspecies:

 Allocasuarina eriochlamys subsp. eriochlamys 
 Allocasuarina eriochlamys subsp. grossa

The species was first described by the botanist Lawrence Alexander Sidney Johnson in 1989 in the work Casuarinaceae. Flora of Australia.

References

eriochlamys
Rosids of Western Australia
Fagales of Australia
Plants described in 1989